Sir Herbert James Stanley,  (25 July 1872 – 5 June 1955) was a leading British colonial administrator, who served at different times as Governor of Northern Rhodesia, Ceylon and Southern Rhodesia.

Life and career 
Born in England, Stanley was educated at Eton College and Balliol College, Oxford, and worked in the foreign service in Dresden and Coburg before serving as the Resident Commissioner for Southern and Northern Rhodesia from 1911 to 1914.

Stanley proved controversial in this role when he refused to allow settlers to take land from Africans, instead assigning  in perpetuity exclusively for the use of Africans.

Based in South Africa during World War I, Stanley married Reniera Cloete, from a leading Cape Town family, in Cape Town in 1918. She was described as "one of the most beautiful women of the century in any country of the world".

In 1918, Stanley was appointed imperial secretary in South Africa, a position he held until 1924, when he was appointed the inaugural governor of Northern Rhodesia. As governor, Stanley sought an amalgamation of the central African colonies and an extension of the Northern Rhodesian railway into Southern Rhodesia. He was also active in establishing and promoting Boy Scouts and Girl Guides.

In 1927, Stanley was transferred to Ceylon as its governor, which drew criticism due to his lack of background knowledge of Asian affairs, although he is reported to have acquitted himself well. Whilst in Ceylon he served as president of the Ceylon Branch of the Royal Asiatic Society in 1929–30.

In 1932, he was made Knight of Grace of the Venerable Order of Saint John

He returned to Africa in 1931 to serve as High Commissioner for the United Kingdom in South Africa before his appointment as Governor of Southern Rhodesia in 1935, initially for a two-year term, but he was persuaded to remain in Salisbury until 1942, when he retired from active service.

Upon his retirement, Stanley settled in Cape Town and was appointed chief commissioner of the Boy Scouts of South Africa. He died a widower in a Cape Town nursing home, aged 82, survived by two sons and two daughters.

Family

Herbert Stanley married Reniera Cloete, second daughter of Henry Cloete, in Cape Town in 1918. 

Reniera, Lady Stanley, was created a Dame Commander of the Order of the British Empire (DBE) in 1941. She predeceased her husband and was survived by their four children.

References

1872 births
1955 deaths
Alumni of Balliol College, Oxford
Governors of British Ceylon
Governors of Northern Rhodesia
Governors of Southern Rhodesia
Ambassadors and High Commissioners of the United Kingdom to South Africa
Knights Grand Cross of the Order of St Michael and St George
Politicians from Cape Town
Scouting and Guiding in South Africa
1920s in Northern Rhodesia
1920s in Ceylon
1930s in Ceylon
1930s in Southern Rhodesia
1940s in Southern Rhodesia
20th-century British politicians
Members of the Legislative Council of Ceylon